Rendezvous is a Latin jazz album by Michel Camilo, released in 1993 on the Columbia Records label. The album was produced by Camilo and Julio Marti and features nine tracks.

Reception
The AllMusic reviewer commented: "Latin-tinged cookers like 'Tropical Jam' and 'Blacky' will rivet you with an improvisational energy you've never heard before, while the simple romance of 'Remembrance' offers a tender counterpoint to all the friskiness."

Track listing 
Tropical Jam (Michel Camilo) – 3:28
Caravan (Duke Ellington, Irving Mills, Juan Tizol) – 5:40
El Realejo (Michel Camilo) – 4:49
Rendezvous (Michel Camilo) – 5:08
As One (Michel Camilo) – 7:39
Remembrance (Michel Camilo) – 5:13
Blacky (Michel Camilo) – 5:06
Albertina (Michel Camilo) – 4:39
From Within (Michel Camilo) – 8:02

Personnel 
Michel Camilo – piano
Anthony Jackson – bass
Dave Weckl – drums

References

External links 
 Michel Camilo discography

1993 albums
Michel Camilo albums
Columbia Records albums